is the first single of Morning Musume's tenth anniversary team Morning Musume Tanjō 10nen Kinentai. It was released on January 24, 2007, while the Single V DVD was released on February 21.

The CD single had two editions. A limited edition which contained a bonus DVD and the regular edition containing one photocard that was only available on its first press.
A Single V was also released.

It reached number 8 on the Oricon Charts in Japan. "Bokura ga Ikiru MY ASIA" is used as an image song for Dralion, a Cirque du Soleil show.

Track listings

CD single 

"Bokura ga Ikiru MY ASIA" (Instrumental)

Single V DVD 
"Bokura ga Ikiru MY ASIA"
"Bokura ga Ikiru MY ASIA" (5-shot Version)

The entire music video was recorded in double time, meaning the music and dance was shot at twice the regular speed and later slowed down with video editing software.

Musical personnel 
Kaori Iida – vocals
Natsumi Abe – vocals
Maki Goto – vocals
Risa Niigaki – vocals
Koharu Kusumi – vocals
 Yuichi Takahashi – guitar
 CHINO – chorus
Tsunku – chorus
 Takeuchi Hiroaki – chorus

Trivia 
In , there are many references to past Morning Musume songs, including:

 "Morning Coffee"
 "Love Machine"
 "Koi no Dance Site"
 "Happy Summer Wedding"
 "Ren'ai Revolution 21"
 "The Peace!"
 "Mr. Moonlight (Ai no Big Band)"
 "Sōda! We're Alive"
 "Koko ni Iruzee!"
 "Shabondama"
 "Ai Araba It's All Right"
 "Roman (My Dear Boy)"
 "The Manpower!!!"
 "Osaka Koi no Uta"
 "Chokkan 2 (Nogashita Sakana wa Ōkiizo!)"
 "Aruiteru"

References

External links 
"Bokura ga Ikiru MY ASIA" entries on the Up-Front Works official website: CD entry, DVD entry

Morning Musume songs
Zetima Records singles
2007 singles
Song recordings produced by Tsunku
Japanese-language songs
2007 songs